Saint Bonifacius, often stylized as St. Bonifacius, is a small city in Hennepin County, Minnesota, United States, 25 miles west of Minneapolis. Settled in the 1850s, the town has a combination of rural and exurban features. It is completely surrounded by Minnetrista, Minnesota, and is close to the county line with Carver County. It hosted a Nike Hercules battery during the Cold War, one of four protecting Minneapolis–Saint Paul from Soviet bombers.

The population was 2,283 at the 2010 census. The Dakota Rail Regional Trail runs through town.

Geography

It is completely surrounded by the city of Minnetrista.

Demographics

2010 census
As of the census of 2010, there were 2,283 people, 863 households, and 624 families living in the city. The racial makeup of the city was 94.2% White, 1.9% African American, 0.1% Native American, 1.8% Asian, 0.1% Pacific Islander, 0.5% from other races, and 1.4% from two or more races. Hispanic or Latino of any race were 3.2% of the population.

There were 863 households, of which 41.4% had children under the age of 18 living with them, 63.2% were married couples living together, 7.3% had a female householder with no husband present, 1.9% had a male householder with no wife present, and 27.7% were non-families. 20.7% of all households were made up of individuals, and 5.3% had someone living alone who was 65 years of age or older. The average household size was 2.65 and the average family size was 3.12.

The median age in the city was 36.2 years. 28.9% of residents were under the age of 18; 5.2% were between the ages of 18 and 24; 32.1% were from 25 to 44; 25.4% were from 45 to 64; and 8.5% were 65 years of age or older. The gender makeup of the city was 50.9% male and 49.1% female.

2000 census
As of the census of 2000, there were 1,873 people, 681 households, and 546 families living in the city. The racial makeup of the city was 97.01% White, 0.16% African American, 0.11% Native American, 0.91% Asian, 0.59% from other races, and 1.23% from two or more races. Hispanic or Latino of any race were 1.76% of the population.

There were 681 households, out of which 45.1% had children under the age of 18 living with them, 69.8% were married couples living together, 7.0% had a female householder with no husband present, and 19.8% were non-families. 15.0% of all households were made up of individuals, and 3.7% had someone living alone who was 65 years of age or older.  The average household size was 2.75 and the average family size was 3.07.

In the city, the population was spread out, with 29.5% under the age of 18, 6.4% from 18 to 24, 41.1% from 25 to 44, 16.7% from 45 to 64, and 6.5% who were 65 years of age or older.  The median age was 32 years. For every 100 females, there were 108.1 males.  For every 100 females age 18 and over, there were 107.1 males.

The median income for a household in the city was $65,446, and the median income for a family was $69,938. Males had a median income of $43,173 versus $31,354 for females. The per capita income for the city was $24,933.  About 2.8% of families and 3.2% of the population were below the poverty line, including 4.8% of those under age 18 and 2.4% of those age 65 or over.

Politics

Education
Waconia Public Schools operates the area public schools, including Waconia High School.

Notable person
Milt Bruhn (1912–1991), American football player and coach

References

External links
City website

Cities in Hennepin County, Minnesota
Cities in Minnesota